The Trade Union Confederation of the Americas (TUCA-CSA) is the regional organization of the International Trade Union Confederation for the Americas.

History
The confederation was formed in March 2008 when the ICFTU Inter American Regional Organisation of Workers merged with the Latin American Confederation of Workers. The organization has 48 affiliated organizations, in 21 countries, representing 55 million workers.

Leadership

General Secretaries
2008: Víctor Báez
2018: Rafael Freire Neto

Presidents
2008: Linda Chavez-Thompson
2012: Hassan Yussuff
2021: Fred Redmond

References

 
International organizations based in the Americas
Trade unions established in 2008
Organizations based in Montevideo